Indoline is an aromatic heterocyclic organic compound with the chemical formula C8H9N. It has a bicyclic structure, consisting of a six-membered benzene ring fused to a five-membered nitrogen-containing ring. The compound is based on the indole structure, but the 2-3 bond is saturated. By oxidation/dehydrogenation it can be converted to indoles.

Indoline was used to make Indocaine.

References